Kupon-e Sofla (also Romanized as Kūpon-e Soflá; also known as Kūpān, Kūpān, Kūpen Soflá, Kūpen Vostá, Kūpon-e Pā’īn, and Kupūn) is a village in Rostam-e Seh Rural District, Sorna District, Rostam County, Fars Province, Iran. At the 2006 census, its population was 227, in 48 families.

References 

Populated places in Rostam County